Main Attrakionz is an American hip hop duo from Oakland, California, composed of rappers Mondre M.A.N. (Damondre Grice) and Squadda B (Charles Glover).

Career
Grice and Glover met in the seventh grade when they were both kicked out of math class, and began recording raps together. The two have continued to collaborate and have become known as significant players in the "cloud rap" movement, which features "a splinter sound that's ethereal and often hooked around cascading synth lines and amorphous beats".

On March 2, 2012, Main Attrakionz released Cloudlife, a collaborative EP with Jel and Zachg. On October 22, 2012, the duo released their first album, Bossalinis & Fooliyones, which was noted in Spin to have "nine-song run from 'On Tour' to 'Bury Me a Millionaire' is as impressive as anything on a rap record this year". On their review of the album, Pitchfork said of the duo, "here are two guys who clearly love to rap and work hard at it, taking a style they can call their own, and presenting it in a more user-friendly way. More often than not, they make it work".

On March 11, 2013, the duo collaborated with Montreal-based production duo, Grown Folk and Berlin dubstep artist, Kuedo to release the Cloud City EP, which SF Weekly noted as "probably one of their more out-there collaborations to date". On June 30, 2015, the duo released 808s & Dark Grapes III, which was produced by Friendzone.

Discography

Studio albums
 Bossalinis & Fooliyones (2012)
 808s & Dark Grapes III (2015)

Mixtapes
 Self Made Classic Vol. I: Zombies on tha Turf (2009)
 Main Attrakionz Hip Hop (2009)
 Rackstylin' 101 (2010)
 Best Duo Ever: The Greentape (2010)
 Blood Money (2010)
 Wardrobe Music (2010)
 Blackberry Ku$h (2011)
 Chandelier (2011)
 808s & Dark Grapes (2011)
 808s & Dark Grapes II (2011)
 Chandelier Redux (2012)
 Tag Champz Bundle (2012)
 Best Duo Ever: The Bricktape (2013)
 Main Attrakionz x Tynethys (2013) 
 Main Attrakionz Niggaz (2013)

EPs
 Niggas on the Run Eatin (2012)
 Cloudlife (2012) 
 Cloud City EP (2013) 
 Jeffro (2013)

Singles
 "Perfect Skies" / "Chuch" (2011)
 "Rap Paradise" (2012)
 "Zombies on the Turf Pt. 2" (2012)
 "Women We Chase" (2012)
 "Green Ova to the Top" (2012) 
 "Do It for the Bay" (2012)
 "Higher" (2015)

Guest appearances
 Spaceghostpurrp - "StonerGang Raiders" from Blvcklvnd Rvdix 66.6 (2011)
 Shady Blaze - "Hood Nigga" from Rappers Ain't $#!% Without a Producer (2011)
 Sortahuman - "Stonergang" from Lysergic Bliss (2011)
 Peaking Lights - "Marshmellow Yellow Remix" from Remixes (2011)
 ASAP Rocky - "Leaf" from Live. Love. ASAP (2011)
 DaVinci - "Cheeba" from The Moena Lisa (2012)
 Mishka & Rad Reef - "Hyperbolic Chamber Music" (2012)
 Lo-Fi-Fnk - "Kissing Taste (Main Attrakionz Remix)" from Kissing Taste (2012)
 Kool A.D. - "Oooh" and "Ticky Tacky" from 51 (2012)
 Jam City - "The Nite Life" from Classical Curves (2012)
 Fat Tony and Tom Cruz - "Double Up" from Double Dragon (2012)
 100s - "Passion" from Ice Cold Perm (2012)
 Deniro Farrar & Shady Blaze - "Fallen Soldiers" from Kill or Be Killed (2012)
 Shady Blaze - "Fucked Up" from The 5th Chapter (2013)
 Mishka & Rad Reef - "Hyperbolic Chamber Music II" (2013)
 !!! - "Californiyeah (Patrick Ford Remix)" (2013)
 DaVinci & Sweet Valley - "Intl Go Girl" from Ghetto Cuisine (2014)
 Noah23 - "Tidal Wave" from Peacock Angel (2015)

References

External links
 

Alternative hip hop groups
American musical duos
Musical groups from Oakland, California
Musical groups established in 2010
Hip hop duos
Hip hop groups from California
African-American musical groups
2010 establishments in California